The Egyptian Navy, also known as the Egyptian Naval Force, is the maritime branch of the Egyptian Armed Forces. It is the largest navy in the Middle East as well as Africa, and is the twelfth largest (by the number of vessels) navy in the world. The navy protects more than 2,000 kilometers of coastline of the Mediterranean Sea and the Red Sea, defense of approaches to the Suez Canal, and it also supports for army operations. The majority of the modern Egyptian Navy was created with the help of the Soviet Union in the 1960s. The navy received ships in the 1980s from China and other Western sources. In 1989, the Egyptian Navy had 18,000 personnel as well as 2,000 personnel in the Coast Guard. The navy received ships from the US in 1990. US shipbuilder Swiftships has built around 30 boats for the Egyptian Navy including mine hunters, survey vessels, and both steel and aluminium patrol boats.

History

Egypt has had a navy since Ancient Egyptian times. The Ancient Egyptian Navy was a vital part of the military of ancient Egypt. It helped to transport troops along the Nile River and fighting many battles such as the Battle of the Delta against the Sea Peoples, and played a major role in Egyptian Wars and battles such as the siege of Avaris in c. 1540 BC. The Ancient Egyptian Navy imported many of their ships from countries such as the Kingdom of Cyprus. Several Ancient Egyptian royal ships are still present today.

In the early 1800s, Egypt under Muhammad Ali Pasha developed a modern European-style army and navy. After intervening in the Greek War of Independence at Ottoman Turkey's request, the Egyptian navy was destroyed in 1827 at the Battle of Navarino by the fleets of Great Britain, France and Russia. With the Egyptian army in Greece then isolated, Muhammad Ali made terms with the British and withdrew a year later.

A replacement fleet was built for the First Egyptian–Ottoman War in 1831, and landed troops at Jaffa in support of the main Egyptian army marching into Syria. In the Second Egyptian–Ottoman War in 1839, following Egyptian victory in the Battle of Nezib, the Ottoman fleet sailed to Alexandria and defected to the Egyptian side. However, these victories provoked decisive European intervention to support the Turks, and while Muhammad Ali's dynasty continued to reign, Egypt ended up being transformed into a British protectorate until being granted independence in 1921.

The Egyptian navy was only peripherally involved in the series of conflicts with Israel. On 22 October 1948, the Egyptian sloop El Amir Farouq was sunk in the Mediterranean Sea off Gaza by a motor explosive boat of the Israeli Navy during the Israeli naval campaign in Operation Yoav as part of the 1948 Arab–Israeli War. During the Suez Crisis, Egypt dispatched the Ibrahim el Awal, an ex-British Hunt class destroyer, to Haifa with the aim of shelling the city's coastal oil installations. On 31 October the Ibrahim el Awal reached Haifa and began bombarding the city but was driven off by a French warship and then pursued by the Israeli destroyers INS Eilat and INS Yaffo which, with the help of the Israeli Air Force, captured the ship.
Egyptian destroyers and torpedo boats engaged larger British vessels in a move aimed at frustrating the amphibious operations of the British and French. On the night of 31 October in the northern Red Sea, the British light cruiser HMS Newfoundland challenged and engaged the Egyptian frigate Domiat, eventually sinking it in a brief gun battle. The Egyptian warship was then sunk by escorting destroyer HMS Diana, with 69 surviving Egyptian sailors rescued.

The Egyptian Navy's blockade of Israeli ships in the Strait of Tiran that were headed toward the Israeli port of Eilat was one of the main causes of the Six-Day War. During the war, the Israeli Navy landed six combat divers from the Shayetet 13 naval commando unit to infiltrate Alexandria harbor. The divers sank an Egyptian minesweeper
 before being taken prisoner. Both Egyptian and Israeli warships made movements at sea to intimidate the other side throughout the war, but did not engage each other. However, Israeli warships and aircraft did hunt for Egyptian submarines throughout the war.

In October 1967, a few months after the cease-fire, the Egyptian Navy was the first navy in history to sink a ship using anti-ship missiles, when an Egyptian Komar-class fast-attack craft sank the Israeli destroyer INS Eilat with two direct hits. This was a milestone of modern naval warfare, and for the first time anti-ship missiles showed their potential, sinking the destroyer 17 km off Port Said.

On the night of 15–16 November 1969, Egyptian Navy frogmen attacked the port of Eilat and caused severe damages to the armed transport ship Bat Yam. On 5–6 February 1970, the frogmen attacked the Israeli landing ships at the same port and same piers causing severe damages to the landing ship Bait Shivaa and transport armed ship Hydroma. On 8 March 1970, the frogmen attacked the Israeli oil drill Keting at the port of Abidjan in Ivory Coast believing that Israel had bought this oil drill from the Netherlands for the purposes of oil exploration in the Suez Gulf.

In the Yom Kippur War, Egypt blocked commercial traffic to Eilat in the Gulf of Aqaba by laying mines; it also attempted to blockade Israeli ports on the Mediterranean. The navy also used the coastal artillery to the east of Port Fouad to support the Egyptian Army in order to prepare for the assault on the Suez Canal. In the Battle of Baltim, three Egyptian Osa-class missile boats were sunk.

Ranks

Officers

Enlisted

Flags

Rank flags

Bases

Mediterranean
The Egyptian navy's headquarters and main base is at Alexandria on the Mediterranean Sea with other Mediterranean naval bases at Port Said, Garoub and Mersa Matruh.

Red Sea
Egyptian naval bases on the Red Sea are Hurghada, Safaga, Berenice, and Suez.

Present fleet
The Egyptian Navy is structured into two different fleets, one for the Mediterranean sea and the other for the Red Sea. This in a context where the safety of shipping in the Red Sea is becoming increasingly important.

Ships

Aircraft
The navy lacked its own air arm and depended on the air force for maritime reconnaissance and protection against submarines. The air force's equipment that supported the navy included twelve Gazelle and five Sea King helicopters mounted with antiship and antisubmarine missiles. In mid-1988 the air force also took delivery of the first of six Grumman E-2c Hawkeye aircraft with search and side-looking radar for maritime surveillance purposes.

The Egyptian Air Force equipment that supports the navy includes the following:
9 Aérospatiale Gazelle, used for naval shore reconnaissance. 
10 Kaman SH-2G Super Seasprite (with 3 additional used as spares), armed with Anti submarine torpedoes.
5 Westland Sea King helicopters mounted with antiship missiles and antisubmarine torpedoes. 
In mid-1988 the air force also took delivery of the first of 6 Grumman E-2C Hawkeye aircraft, now 8 units are operational and are used to secure the maritime borders among other missions; it also operates 6 Beechcraft 1900C aircraft for maritime surveillance purposes with search and side-looking radar. The Egyptian Navy also uses Mil Mi-8 and Sea King helicopters to transport troops.
also Russia confirmed the sale of 46 Ka-52Ks to Egypt in December 2015. Russian Helicopters Director-General Alexander Mikheyev said deliveries to Egypt are expected to occur in 2017. In April 2019 Egyptian Navy ordered 24 Agusta Westland AW149 helicopters

Submarine fleet
Egypt has 4 Type 209 German submarines and also operates 4 ex-Chinese Romeo-class submarines which have been revitalized to use Western periscopes, trailing GPS, passive sonars, a fire control system, and the ability to fire US-made harpoon missiles.

Amphibious fleet

The first Mistral helicopter carrier named after late President Gamal Abdel-Nasser arrived in Alexandria in June 2016.
On 16 September 2016, the Egyptian Navy Commander, Admiral Osama Rabie, raised the Egyptian flag on board of the BPC-210 Mistral Class amphibious assault ship (BPC/LHD). 
Russia and Egypt had signed a deal for Egypt's purchase of 50 Ka-52 Alligator attack helicopters from Russia. The purchase includes the variant of the Ka-52 Katran, which specifically designed for the Mistrals that Russia had intended to acquire.

Surface fleet
Only those escorts capable of operating troop-lift helicopters (Kaman SH-2G Seasprite) are shown. It must, though, be accepted that all surface ships can launch and recover the rubber assault craft known to be used by the army's commando groups. Additionally the two, 1,702 ton Jianghu I class FFGs and the two, 1,479 ton Descubierta class FFGs can supply naval gunfire support.

Patrol forces
The Egyptian Navy has a potent fleet of fast attack craft, many fitted with missile systems. These and the navy-manned vessels of the Coast Guard, would be deployed in support of amphibious landings and certainly in their prevention. The US shipbuilder Swiftships is one of the main providers of vessels for the Egyptian Navy. It has built around 30 boats for the Egyptian Navy mainly costal patrol crafts 28m for coastal defense, anti-surface operations, maritime security operations and maritime interdiction, surveillance and intelligence gathering, and search and rescue operations.

Equipment

Ship to ship/surface missiles
P-270 Moskit/SS-N-22 with 120 km range and 320 kg payload (launched from P-32 Molniya-class missile boat).
HY-1 with 85 km range and 513 kg payload (launched from Hegu-class Coastal FAC/M).
Harpoon Block II with more than 124 km range and 220 kg payload (launched from Ambassador-class FPB/M, Knox-class frigates, Oliver Hazard Perry-class frigates and Descubierta-class light frigates).
Exocet (MM-40 Block 3) with >180 km range and 165 kg payload (launched from Gowind-class corvettes and Fremm-class frigates).
Otomat Mk 2 Block III with >180 km range and 210 kg payload (launched from Ramadan-class FPB/M & October-class FAC/M).
SS-N-2C Styx with 80 km range and 513 kg payload (launched from OSA I).

Surface to ship/surface missile (coastal defence)
FL-1 with 150 km range and 513 kg payload.
KSR-2 (AS-5 "Kelt") with 200 km range and 1000 kg payload. (Modified from air-launched version)
Otomat MkII with >180 km range and 210 kg payload.
Exocet (MM-40 MK III) with 180 km range and 165 kg payload.

The Egyptian Coast Guard

The Egyptian Coast Guard is responsible for the onshore protection of public installations near the coast and the patrol of coastal waters to prevent smuggling.  Currently consists of one hundred five ships and craft.

Patrol boats
 22 Timsah I/II class
 12 Sea Spectre PB Mk III class
 9 Swiftships 28m class
 6 MV70 class
 5 P-6 (Project 183) class
 3 Textron class

Patrol craft
 25 Swiftships 26m class
 16 SR.N6 class
 9 Type 83 class
 6 Crestitalia class
 12 Spectre class
 12 Peterson class
 5 Nisr class
 29 DC-30 class
 3 of 6 MRTP-20 Yonka Onuk MRTP-20 class

Recent developments
The Egyptian Navy has adopted the 60m diesel-powered Ambassador MK III fast missile patrol craft. The construction of the boats began in spring 2001. Egypt already had an older version of the Ambassador patrol craft in service, but the new boats would contain an update in design meant to make the vessels more resistant to radar detection. Design was conducted with the assistance of Lockheed Martin. Throughout recent years, Egypt has been constructing various Ramos-grade shipyards, which are capable of making more recent vessels like larger fast attack craft, low-grade aircraft carriers (such as Oryx-class or Nimitz-class) and nuclear submarines, though none of the aforementioned vessels have been constructed there.

The navy is currently undergoing a modernization of its surface fleet. On 16 February 2015, the Egyptian Navy ordered one FREMM multipurpose frigate from the French shipbuilder DCNS to enter service before the opening of the New Suez Canal, as part of a larger deal (including 24 Rafales and a supply of missiles) worth €5.2bn. Egypt has also signed a €1bn contract with DCNS to buy four Gowind 2,500 ton corvettes with an option for two more. The ageing submarine fleet is to be replaced starting in 2016 when the first of four Type 209 submarine's worth €920 million start arriving from Germany.

On 7 August 2015, Le Monde reported that Egypt and Saudi Arabia were in discussions with France to purchase the two amphibious assault ship Mistral class originally intended for Russia. Le Monde quoted a French diplomatic source as confirming that French President, François Hollande, discussed the matter with Egyptian President Abdel Fattah el-Sisi during his visit to Egypt during the inauguration of the New Suez Canal in Ismailia. On 24 September 2015, the French presidency announced that an agreement had been reached with Egypt for the supply of the two Mistrals.

In May 2016, Swiftships was awarded a Direct Commercial Contract (DCC) for the construction of six additional 28m CPCs for co-production in Egypt under Swiftships Build, Operate and Transfer (BOT) model. Swiftships has delivered six 28m CPCs already to the EN, which were constructed at the Egyptian Ship Building and Repairs Company (ESBRC) in Alexandria, Egypt. In June 2016 Swiftships was awarded a contract to procure four 28 meter long coastal patrol craft kits for local assembly in Alexandria.

Spiegel online(know Der Spiegel) announced on 2 January 2019 that the German federal security council approved the sale of 1 Meko 200 frigate similar to the South African Valour class for 500 million euros, Egypt also intends to buy at least another frigate of the class in the future . In May 2016, Swiftships was awarded a Direct Commercial Contract (DCC) for the construction of six additional 28m CPCs

In April 2019, the German parliament approved the guarantee of 2.3 billion euros for the sale of 6 Meko A200 class frigates for Egypt.

In 2020, the Italian government accepted the proposal to sell two Bergamini-class frigates to Egypt for a value of 1.2 billion euros.

On 3 July 2021, President Abdel Fattah al-Sisi inaugurated the "July 3 base" at Gargoub, Matrouh Governorate.

In October 2021, it was announced that the UK government had authorised the sale of two withdrawn Fort (I)-class replenishment vessels to Egypt, pending full refurbishment.

In April 2022 Swiftships was awarded another contract for six 28m Coastal Patrol Craft material production kits, Zodiac RIBS, and equipment under a US Foreign Military Sales (FMS) case to Egypt. Swiftships’ 28m boat has a range of 900nmi, which can be extended by afloat refuelling.

Commanders

Egypt Eyalet Navy 
 Sealord / Muharram Bek
 Sealord / Osman Nur Al Din Pasha
 Sealord / Mustafa Motawash Pasha
 Sealord / Sa'id of Egypt
 Sealord / Hassan Pasha Al Iskendarani

Khedival Navy 
 Hafiz Khalil Pasha (1861–1864)
 Abdul Latif Pasha (1864–1871)
 Shahin Pasha (1871–1873)
 Tosun Pasha (1873–1882)

20th century  
After the Egyptian defeat in the Anglo-Egyptian war, the UK abolished the entire military of Egypt and established a small homeland defence force instead even the Navy was abolished and the only maritime force in Egypt was the Coast Guard. In 1908 the Naval Authority was formed as a semi replacement for the former Navy, and was used to control the Egyptian ports and Merchant ships there. In the late 1920s and early 1930s, and after Egypt's independence in 1922 Egypt started building a new modern Navy with British vessels (destroyers, patrol boats, training ships) all under the name 'Naval Authority'. Although a Navy existed but no Naval academy was formed, however, it had a section in the main Military academy. After World War II ended, in 1946, the Naval Authority was renamed into "The Royal Egyptian Navy".
 Vice Admiral Mahmoud Hamza Pasha (6 June 1946 – 1 October 1948)
 Vice Admiral Ahmed Bek Badr (2 October 1948 – 30 September 1951)
 Vice Admiral Mahmoud Bek Badr (1 October 1951 – 27 July 1952)
 Vice Admiral Mohamed Nashid (28 July 1952 – 14 September 1952)
 Vice Admiral Suleiman Ezzat (15 September 1952 – 10 June 1967)
 Admiral Fouad Mohamed Abou Zikry (11 June 1967 – 11 September 1969)
 Rear Admiral Mahmoud Abdel Rahman Fahmy (12 September 1969 – 24 October 1972)
 Admiral Fouad Mohamed Abou Zikry (24 October 1972 – 15 October 1976)
 Vice Admiral Ashraf Refaat
 Vice Admiral Mohamed Ali Mohamed
 Vice Admiral Ali Tawfik Gad (April 1983 – October 1987)
 Vice Admiral Sherif Alsadek (October 1987 – October 1990)
 Vice Admiral Ahmed Fadel
 Vice Admiral Ahmed Saber Selim
 Vice Admiral Tamer Abdel Alim (October 2005 – October 2007)
 Vice Admiral Mohab Mamish (October 2007 – 11 August 2012)
 Vice Admiral Osama El-Gendi (14 August 2012 – 12 April 2015 )
 Vice Admiral Osama Mounir Rabie (13 April 2015 – 16 December 2016)
 Vice Admiral Ahmed Khaled Hassan Saeed (17 December 2016 – 14 December 2021)
 Vice Admiral Ashraf Ibrahim Atwa (14 December 2021 – present)

See also

Ancient Egyptian navy
Battle of Navarino
Egyptian Armed Forces
List of ships of the Egyptian Navy

References

External links
 https://www.mod.gov.eg/ModWebSite/Default.aspx - Egyptian Armed Forces Official Website
 Globalsecurity.org – Egyptian navy

Military of Egypt
 
Articles needing additional references from December 2021